Nduka Odizor and Van Winitsky won in the final 6–3, 7–5 against Steve Denton and Sherwood Stewart.

Seeds
Champion seeds are indicated in bold text while text in italics indicates the round in which those seeds were eliminated.

 Tim Gullikson /  Tom Gullikson (first round)
 Steve Denton /  Sherwood Stewart (final)
 John Alexander /  Kevin Curren (quarterfinals)
 Sandy Mayer /  Ferdi Taygan (semifinals)

Draw

External links
1983 Dallas Open Doubles Draw

Doubles